The Garage and Fire Station in Fort Peck, Montana, on Gasconade St., was built in 1934.  It is also known as Security Center (Fire & Police) and Vehicle Storage.  It was listed in the National Register of Historic Places in 1986.

Like many other Fort Peck buildings, it was designed by architects Johnson, Drake & Piper.  It is an L-shaped one-story wood-frame building which is Swiss Chalet in style.  It was originally stained brown or gray, like the other Swiss Chalet buildings, and its trim was painted blue, green, red, or maroon.  It has some timber bracketing.

The building served as Fort Peck's fire station and police station, and also stored vehicles.

References

Police stations
Fire stations on the National Register of Historic Places in Montana
National Register of Historic Places in Valley County, Montana
Buildings and structures completed in 1934
1934 establishments in Montana
Fort Peck, Montana
Swiss Chalet Revival architecture